Adela janineae is a species of moth of the family Adelidae. It is known from Madagascar.

References

Adelidae
Moths of Madagascar
Moths of Africa
Moths described in 1954